The 19th Daytime Emmy Awards were held on June 23, 1992, hosted by Phil Donahue and Susan Lucci.

Outstanding Drama Series
All My Children
As the World Turns
Guiding Light
The Young and the Restless

Outstanding Lead Actor
Peter Bergman (Jack Abbott, The Young and the Restless)
David Canary (Adam Chandler & Stuart Chandler, All My Children)
Nicolas Coster (Lionel Lockridge, Santa Barbara)
A Martinez (Cruz Castillo, Santa Barbara)
Michael Zaslow (Roger Thorpe, Guiding Light)

Outstanding Lead Actress
Jeanne Cooper (Katherine Chancellor, The Young and the Restless)
Elizabeth Hubbard (Lucinda Walsh, As the World Turns)
Susan Lucci (Erica Kane, All My Children)
Erika Slezak (Victoria Lord, One Life to Live)
Jessica Tuck (Megan Gordon Harrison, One Life to Live)

Outstanding Supporting Actor
Bernie Barrow (Louie Slavinski, Loving)
Thom Christopher (Carlo Hesser, One Life to Live)
Rick Hearst (Alan-Michael Spaulding, Guiding Light)
Charles Keating (Carl Hutchins, Another World)
Jerry verDorn (Ross Marler, Guiding Light)

Outstanding Supporting Actress
Darlene Conley (Sally Spectra, The Bold and the Beautiful)
Linda Dano (Felicia Gallant, Another World)
Maureen Garrett (Holly Reade, Guiding Light)
Lynn Herring (Lucy Coe, General Hospital)
Maeve Kinkead (Vanessa Chamberlain, Guiding Light)

Outstanding Younger Actor
Scott DeFreitas (Andrew Dixon, As the World Turns)
Jeff Phillips (Hart Jessup, Guiding Light)
James Patrick Stuart (Will Cortlandt, All My Children)
Kristoff St. John (Neil Winters, The Young and the Restless)
Dondre Whitfield (Terrence Frye, All My Children)

Outstanding Younger Actress
Tricia Cast (Nina Webster, The Young and the Restless)
Beth Ehlers (Harley Cooper, Guiding Light)
Alla Korot (Jenna Norris, Another World)
Cady McClain (Dixie Cooney, All My Children)
Melissa Reeves (Jennifer Horton, Days of Our Lives)

Outstanding Drama Series Writing Team
All My Children
Guiding Light
One Life to Live
The Young and the Restless

Outstanding Drama Series Directing Team
Another World
As the World Turns
The Young and the Restless

Outstanding Game Show
Jeopardy! (Merv Griffin Enterprises/KingWorld)
The $100,000 Pyramid (Stewart TeleEnterprises/Multimedia Entertainment)
Family Feud (Mark Goodson Productions/All American Television/CBS)
The Price Is Right (Mark Goodson Productions/All American Television/CBS)

Outstanding Game Show Host
Bob Barker (The Price Is Right)
Dom DeLuise (Candid Camera)
Alex Trebek (Jeopardy!)

Outstanding Hairstyling
Richard Sabre, and Tish Simpson (Adventures in Wonderland)
Robert Miss (The Joan Rivers Show)

Outstanding Film Sound Mixing
Jim Hodson, Bill Koepnick and Harry Andronis (Back to the Future: The Animated Series)
Harry Andronis, Tom Maydeck and Russell Brower (Tiny Toon Adventures)
Bruce Chianese (Spaceship Earth: Our Global Environment)
James L. Aicholtz, Robert L. Harman and Allen L. Stone (Darkwing Duck)
Robert L. Harman, James L. Aicholtz and Patrick Cyccone Jr. (James Bond Jr.)
James L. Aicholtz and Robert L. Harman (Teenage Mutant Ninja Turtles)

Outstanding Film Sound Editing
Bill Koepnick, Russell Brower, Jim Hodson, Aaron L. King, Matt Thorne and Mark Keatts (Back to the Future: The Animated Series)
Warren Taylor, Ivan Bilancio and Richard C. Allen (Muppet Babies)
Charlie King, Andrew Rose, David Lynch, Jennifer Harrison, Rich Harrison, Rick Hinson and Jerry Winicki (The New Adventures of Winnie the Pooh)
Carol Lewis, John Mortarotti, Kerry Dean Williams, Martina Young, Rich Harrison, Catherine MacKenzie, Doub Pearce and Tally Paulos (Teenage Mutant Ninja Turtles)
Jennifer Harrison, Rick Hinson, Cecil Broughton, Rich Harrison, David Lynch, Jerry Winicki, Charlie King and Andrew Rose (Darkwing Duck)

Outstanding Music Direction and Composition
Mark Watters (Tiny Toon Adventures - "Love Disconnection")
Mark Mothersbaugh, Laura Raty (Pedretti), Mona Lia Ventris, Andrew Todd, John C. Volaitis, Jim Goodwin, Bill Mumy, David Kendrick, Patricia Friedman, Denis M. Hannigan and Michael Alemania (Adventures in Wonderland)
Cheryl Hardwick, Stephen Lawrence, Dave Conner, Paul Jacobs, Christopher Cerf, Sarah Durkee, Tony Geiss and Jeff Moss (Sesame Street)
Bodie Chandler, Gary Lionelli and Tom Worrall (Tom & Jerry Kids)

Outstanding Writing in an Animated Program
Nicholas Hollander, Tom Ruegger, Paul Dini, and Sherri Stoner (Tiny Toon Adventures)
Carter Crocker, and Tad Stones (Darkwing Duck - "Dead Duck")
Craig Bartlett, Paul Germain, Joe Ansolabehere, Mitchell Kriegman, Steve Viksten (Rugrats)
Steve Roberts, Duane Capizzi (Darkwing Duck - "Negaduck")
Mark Evanier (Garfield and Friends)
Henry Gilroy, Gordon Kent, Bill Kopp, Art Vitello, Chris Otsuki, and Mark Saraceni (Taz-Mania)

Outstanding Animated Program
Vanessa Coffey, Gabor Csupo, Arlene Klasky, Paul Germain, Mary Harrington, Sherry Gunther, David Blum, Bee Beckman, Norton Virgien, Howard E. Baker, and Dan Thompson (Rugrats)
Brad Gunther, Johan Edström, Christine Martin, Tony Eastman, David Campbell, Melanie Grisanti, Vanessa Coffey, Yvette Kaplan, Jean-Pierre Jacquet, Jim Jinkins, David Martin, John Paratore, Carol Millican, Ken Kimmelman, Mary Harrington (Doug)
Steven Spielberg, Tom Ruegger, Sherri Stoner, Rich Arons, and Art Leonardi (Tiny Toon Adventures)
Tad Stones, Alan Zaslove, Bob Hathcock, Ken Kessel, Russ Mooney, Toby Shelton (producer), Hank Tucker (producer), James T. Walker, Carole Beers, Marsh Lamore, Rick Leon, and John Kimball (Darkwing Duck)
Ken Kessel, Mark Zaslove, Russ Mooney, Terence Harrison, Charles A. Nichols (The New Adventures of Winnie the Pooh)

Lifetime achievement award
William J. Bell

References

019
Daytime Emmy Awards